Felice Schachter (born November 17, 1963) is an American actress, best known for her roles as Nancy Olson on The Facts of Life and Bernadette in the cult teen comedy Zapped!.

Early life and career 
Schachter was born in New York City, the daughter of Suzanne Schachter (née Mokotoff), a theatrical manager, and Alex Schachter, a real estate developer and accountant. She has two younger sisters. Schachter's mother, the founder of Suzelle Enterprises, helped her get her start at the age of four months, when she appeared on the cover of American Baby magazine. By 1982, Schachter had done over 100 TV commercials, including Ivory Snow, Pampers, Downy, Baby Alive, and Jordache Jeans.

Schachter started her show business career in 1975, appearing in an off-Broadway production of The Innocents, and later in Time Again.  She later danced in productions including The Taming of the Shrew with Stuttgart Ballet, Sleeping Beauty with Bolshoi Ballet, and Nutcracker Suite with the New York City Ballet.

Television and film 
She started her television career on the 1976 mini-series The Adams Chronicles. She then played what would be her most notable role, Nancy, on The Facts of Life from 1979 to 1982.  She played the role regularly until she quit acting to pursue an education at Brown University in 1981, although she would continue to make guest appearances on the show until 1986. Her first, and only, major film credit was as Bernadette in the 1982 movie Zapped!, starring opposite Scott Baio. Other television roles included Diff'rent Strokes, the soap opera Love of Life, NBC Quiz Kids, Alice, New Monkees, and Love, American Style, among others.

After she quit acting to go to school, Schachter was a radio anchor with Brown University's WBRU in Providence, Rhode Island, and later a sports broadcaster for CBS Sports (1983–85) and PRIME (1986–87).

Production 
In the 1990s, she began working behind the camera, with production credits on such film and television projects as Magic Island, After The Game, the pilot for JAG, Uncle Sam, Twilight of the Golds, High Tide, Born Free, The Citizen, Waiting For The Monkeys, The Gnomes' Great Adventure, Waste Land, Jackie, Knockaround Guys and 30 Years to Life. She was the production coordinator for the series Law & Order: Special Victims Unit.

Filmography

Awards and nominations

References

External links 

1963 births
American child actresses
American film actresses
American television actresses
Brown University alumni
National Hockey League broadcasters
Living people
Actresses from New York City
New York City Ballet dancers
American ballerinas
Musicians from Queens, New York
20th-century American actresses